The Battle of Sekigahara (Kyūjitai: , Hepburn romanization: Sekigahara no Tatakai) was a decisive battle on October 21, 1600 (Keichō 5, 15th day of the 9th month) in what is now Gifu prefecture, Japan, at the end of the Sengoku period. This battle was fought by the forces of Tokugawa Ieyasu against a coalition of Toyotomi loyalist clans under Ishida Mitsunari, several of which defected before or during the battle, leading to a Tokugawa victory. The Battle of Sekigahara was the largest battle of Japanese feudal history and is often regarded as the most important. Toyotomi's defeat led to the establishment of the Tokugawa shogunate.

Tokugawa Ieyasu took three more years to consolidate his position of power over the Toyotomi clan and the various daimyō, but the Battle of Sekigahara is widely considered to be the unofficial beginning of the Tokugawa shogunate, which ruled Japan for another two and a half centuries until 1868.

Background

Toyotomi clan rule 
Toyotomi Hideyoshi was a prominent general under Oda Nobunaga. Nobunaga unified much of Japan under his rule after defeating the Shōgun Ashikaga Yoshiaki and ending the Ashikaga shogunate; however, he was betrayed by Akechi Mitsuhide and died at the Honnō-ji Incident of 1582. Hideyoshi quickly avenged his master and consolidated control over Japan afterward, with the aid of his brother Hidenaga. Hideyoshi had risen from humble roots—his father having been an ashigaru (foot soldier)—to become the ruler of Japan. To bolster his claim, Hideyoshi married noble women so that his heirs at least would descend from suitably distinguished families.

The final years of Hideyoshi's reign were troubled. While rivals in the Hojo clan were defeated at the Siege of Odawara in 1590, failures in the invasions of Korea significantly weakened the Toyotomi clan's power and its support from bureaucrats who served in the government. Additionally, Hideyoshi ordered the execution of Toyotomi Hidetsugu and his entire family in 1595. Hidetsugu was his nephew and heir, as well as the regent at the time who had been expected to take up leadership after Hideyoshi. When Hideyoshi was on his deathbed in 1598, he set up a regency government, as his new heir, Toyotomi Hideyori, was only five years old. Hideyoshi's death created a power vacuum; there was no appointed shōgun over the armies. The respected regent Maeda Toshiie, a neutral party between the clashing factions, kept the peace for a time, but he too died in 1599.

Feuding factions 
Two main factions arose during the fading years of Hideyoshi's rule and the immediate aftermath of his death. Tokugawa Ieyasu was unrivaled in terms of seniority, rank, reputation and overall influence within the regency government, and had the allegiance of many of the lords of eastern Japan. Toyotomi clan loyalists and the lords of western Japan rallied behind Ishida Mitsunari. Tensions between them sometimes boiled into open hostilities, with relations eventually degenerating into the conflicts of 1600 that led to the Battle of Sekigahara.

Katō Kiyomasa and Fukushima Masanori were publicly critical of the bureaucrats, especially Mitsunari and Konishi Yukinaga. Tokugawa Ieyasu took advantage of this situation and recruited them, redirecting the animosity to weaken the Toyotomi clan. Rumours started to spread stating that Ieyasu, at that point the only surviving contemporary ally of Oda Nobunaga, would take over Hideyoshi's legacy just as Nobunaga's was taken. This was especially evident amongst the loyalist bureaucrats, who suspected Ieyasu of agitating unrest amongst Toyotomi's former vassals.

Later, a supposed conspiracy to assassinate Ieyasu surfaced, and many Toyotomi loyalists, including Maeda Toshiie's son, Toshinaga, were accused of taking part and forced to submit to Ieyasu's authority. Uesugi Kagekatsu, one of Hideyoshi's appointed regents, defied Ieyasu by building up his military. When Ieyasu officially condemned him and demanded that he come to Kyoto to explain himself, Kagekatsu's chief advisor, Naoe Kanetsugu, responded with a counter-condemnation that mocked Ieyasu's abuses and violations of Hideyoshi's rules; Ieyasu was infuriated.

Afterwards, Ieyasu summoned the help of various supporters and led them northward to attack the Uesugi clan. However, many of them were at that moment besieging Hasedō. Ishida Mitsunari, grasping the opportunity created by the chaos, rose up in response and created an alliance to challenge Ieyasu's supporters.

Troop deployment 
Ishida, in his home Sawayama Castle, met with Ōtani Yoshitsugu, Mashita Nagamori and Ankokuji Ekei. Here, they forged their alliance, and invited Mōri Terumoto to be its head. They formed what came to be referred to as the Western Army. Mōri seized Osaka Castle for their base of operations, since most of Tokugawa's forces had vacated the area to attack Uesugi.

Ishida wanted to reinforce Mōri at the impregnable Osaka Castle. This would let Ishida control the capital of Kyoto and challenge the Tokugawa. To this end, Ishida's forces headed for Gifu Castle in order to use it as a staging area to move on Kyoto, since it was controlled by his ally Oda Hidenobu.

Back in Edo, Tokugawa Ieyasu received news of the situation in the Kansai region and decided to deploy his forces. Ieyasu himself commanded 30,000 men and his subordinates led another 40,000 men. This made up the bulk of what would later be called the Eastern Army. He had some former Toyotomi daimyō engage with the Western Army, while he split his troops and marched west on the Tōkaidō towards Osaka.

Since the Tokugawa army departed from Edo, it could only take two roads, both of which converged on Gifu Castle. Ieyasu marched on Gifu while Ishida Mitsunari was delayed at Fushimi Castle. This fortress was a halfway point between Osaka and Kyoto and was controlled by the Tokugawa ally Torii Mototada. Ishida could not risk leaving a force that could attack his rear, so he marched on it. It took him ten days to capture Fushimi, and in that time Gifu Castle had fallen. This forced Ishida Mitsunari to retreat southward in the rain. The rain was relevant in that the bulk of both armies were equipped with matchlock rifles (tanegashima), which required dry gunpowder to fire. Ishida Mitsunari and his troops were stationed at Ōgaki Castle by mid-October, 1600. They were evaluating their situation when Tokugawa's army arrived two days later at Mino Akasaka, a few miles away from their location.

Initially, the Eastern Army had 75,000 men, while the Western Army numbered 120,000. Ieyasu had also brought a supply of arquebuses. Knowing that the Tokugawa forces were heading towards Osaka, Ishida decided to abandon his positions and marched to Sekigahara. Even though the Western army had tremendous tactical advantages, Ieyasu had already been in contact with many of the daimyō in the Western Army for months, promising them land and leniency after the battle should they switch sides.

Shima Sakon, one of Mitsunari's commanders, requested permission to attack the nearest Tokugawa troops. Later, Sakon clashed with Honda Tadakatsu at the Battle of Kuisegawa. As a result, the Eastern Army suffered significant losses from the battle and had to pull back from the Mino Akasaka territory to Sekigahara. Not wanting to lose the advantage, Mitsunari ordered his army to surround Ieyasu at Sekigahara. Ishida deployed his troops in a strong defensive position, flanked by two streams with high ground on the opposite banks. His right flank was reinforced by daimyō Kobayakawa Hideaki on Mount Matsuo.

On October 20, 1600, Ieyasu learned that Ishida Mitsunari had deployed his troops at Sekigahara in a defensive position. They had been following the Western Army, and benefited from considerably better weather.

The battle
At dawn on October 21, 1600, the Tokugawa advance guard stumbled into Ishida's army. Neither side saw each other because of the dense fog caused by the earlier rain. Both sides panicked and withdrew, but that resulted in both sides being aware of their adversary's presence.

Ishida held his current defensive position and Ieyasu deployed his forces in south from Ishida forces, he sent his allies' forces in a line to the front and held his own troops in reserve. Around 8:00 am, wind blew away the fog, and both sides noticed their respective adversary's positions. Last-minute orders were issued and the battle began.

The battle started when Fukushima Masanori, the leader of the Tokugawa advance guard, charged north from the Eastern Army's left flank along the Fuji River against the Western Army's right centre under Ukita Hideie. The ground was still muddy from the previous day's rain, so the conflict there devolved into something more primal. Ieyasu then ordered attacks from his right and his centre against the Western Army's left in order to support Fukushima's attack.

This left the Western Army's centre unscathed, so Ishida ordered this unit under the command of Shimazu Yoshihiro to reinforce his right flank. Shimazu refused as daimyō of the day only listened to respected commanders, which Ishida was not.

Fukushima's attack was slowly gaining ground, but this came at the cost of exposing their flank to attack from across the Fuji River by Ōtani Yoshitsugu, who took advantage of this opportunity. Just past Ōtani's forces were those of Kobayakawa Hideaki on Mount Matsuo.

Kobayakawa Hideaki was one of the daimyō who had been courted by Tokugawa. Even though he had agreed to defect to the Tokugawa side, in the actual battle he was hesitant and remained neutral. Some theories mention that as the battle grew more intense, Ieyasu finally ordered his arquebuses to fire at Kobayakawa's position on Mount Matsuo to force a choice. However the sheer distance between the Eastern Army positions and Kobayakawa's, way out of range of arquebuse and even too far for a shot to even be heard, make this very unlikely. Around noon, Kobayakawa eventually joined the battle as a member of the Eastern Army. His forces charged Ōtani's position. Ōtani's forces had dry gunpowder, so they opened fire on the turncoats, making the charge of 16,000 men mostly ineffective. However, Ōtani's troops were already engaging against forces under the command of Tōdō Takatora and Oda Yūraku when Kobayakawa charged. At this point, the buffer Ōtani established was outnumbered. Seeing this, Western Army daimyos Wakisaka Yasuharu, Ogawa Suketada, Akaza Naoyasu and Kutsuki Mototsuna switched sides, turning the tide of battle.

Fall of the Western Army 
Heavily outnumbered, Ōtani had no choice but to retreat. This left the Western Army's right flank wide open, so Fukushima and Kobayakawa began to roll it up. Thus Ishida's right flank was destroyed and his centre was being pushed back, so he retreated.

Ishida's only remaining forces were on Mount Nangu. However, these forces were there for a reason. Kikkawa Hiroie was one of the commanders on the mountain. Kikkawa's troops formed the front lines of the Mōri army, which was commanded by his cousin Mōri Hidemoto. Earlier, when Hidemoto decided to attack the Tokugawa forces, Hiroie refused to comply, stating he was busy eating and asked to be left alone. This in turn prevented the Chōsokabe army, which deployed behind the Mōri clan, from attacking. When Ishida arrived, Kikkawa betrayed him as well. He kept the Mōri army at bay, and since Ishida had no more support, he was defeated.

The Western Army disintegrated afterwards with the commanders scattering and fleeing. Some, like Ukita Hideie, managed to escape, at least initially. Many others did not. Shima Sakon was shot and fatally wounded by a round from an arquebus and Ōtani Yoshitsugu committed suicide. Ishida, Yukinaga and Ekei were some of those who were captured and a few, like Shimazu Yoshihiro, were able to return to their home provinces. Mōri Terumoto and his forces had remained entrenched at Osaka Castle rather than join the battle, and later quietly surrendered to Tokugawa. Ishida himself was later executed.

Late arrivals 
Both sides had forces that did not arrive at Sekigahara in time to participate due to other battles. Ieyasu's son Hidetada led another group through Nakasendō. However, Hidetada's forces were bogged down as he attempted to besiege Sanada Masayuki's Ueda Castle against his father's direct orders. Even though the Tokugawa forces numbered some 38,000, an overwhelming advantage over Sanada's mere 2,000, they were still unable to capture the famous strategist's well-defended position.

At the same time, 15,000 Toyotomi troops were being held up by 500 troops under Hosokawa Yūsai at Tanabe Castle in present-day Maizuru, Kyoto Prefecture. Some among the 15,000 troops respected Hosokawa so much they intentionally slowed their pace. Due to these incidents, a large number of troops from both sides failed to show up in time for the battle. If either of these armies participated in the conflict, it could have ended quite differently.

Aftermath

Rise of the Tokugawa Shogunate 
Following the public executions of Ishida Mitsunari, Konishi Yukinaga and Ankokuji Ekei on November 6, the influence and reputation of the Toyotomi clan and its remaining loyalists drastically decreased. Tokugawa Ieyasu redistributed the lands and fiefs of the participants, generally rewarding those who assisted him and displacing, punishing, or exiling those who fought against him. In doing so, he gained control of many former Toyotomi territories.

At the time, the battle was considered only an internal conflict between Toyotomi vassals. However, after Ieyasu was named shōgun in 1603 by Emperor Go-Yōzei, a position that had been left vacant since the fall of the Ashikaga shōgunate 27 years earlier, the battle was perceived as a more important event. In 1664, Hayashi Gahō, Tokugawa historian and rector of Yushima Seidō, summarised the consequences of the battle: "Evil-doers and bandits were vanquished and the entire realm submitted to Lord Ieyasu, praising the establishment of peace and extolling his martial virtue. That this glorious era that he founded may continue for ten thousands upon ten thousands of generations, coeval with heaven and earth."

Seeds of dissent from Sekigahara 
While most clans were content with their new status, there were many clans, especially those on the Western side, who became bitter about their displacement or what they saw as a dishonorable defeat or punishment. Three clans in particular did not take the aftermath of Sekigahara lightly:

 The Mōri clan, headed by Mōri Terumoto, remained angry toward the Tokugawa shogunate for being displaced from their fief, Aki, and being relocated to the Chōshū Domain, even though the clan did not take part in the battle at all.
 The Shimazu clan, headed by Shimazu Yoshihiro, blamed the defeat on its poor intelligence-gathering, and while they were not displaced from their home province of Satsuma, they did not become completely loyal to the Tokugawa shōgunate either. Taking advantage of its large distance between Edo and the island of Kyūshū as well as its improved espionage, the Shimazu clan demonstrated that it was virtually an autonomous kingdom independent from the Tokugawa shōgunate during its last days.
 The Chōsokabe clan, headed by Chōsokabe Morichika, was stripped of its title and domain of Tosa and sent into exile. Former Chōsokabe retainers never quite came to terms with the new ruling family, the Yamauchi clan, which made a distinction between its own retainers and former Chōsokabe retainers, giving them lesser status as well as discriminatory treatment. This class distinction continued even generations after the fall of the Chōsokabe clan.

The descendants of these three clans would in two centuries collaborate to bring down the Tokugawa shogunate, leading to the Meiji Restoration.

Kokudaka of daimyō 

○ = Main daimyōs who participated in the Battle of Sekigahara

● = Daimyōs who defected

Chronology
Below is a chronology of the events leading up to the final battle of Sekigahara 1600:

May 7 – Ieyasu asks Uesugi Kagekatsu for explanations for his military mobilization. Kagekatsu refuses Ieyasu.
June 8 – Ieyasu calls his allies to punish the Uesugi.
July 12 – Ieyasu holds a meeting in Osaka to plan the punishment of the Uesugi, attended by Date Masamune, Mogami Yoshiaki, Satake Yoshinobu and Nanbu Toshinao.
July 26 – Ieyasu leaves Fushimi Castle after meeting with Torii Mototada.
August 15 – Siege of Tanabe, Onoki Shigekatsu leads a Western army against Hosokawa Fujitaka.
August 16 – Mitsunari meets with Ōtani Yoshitsugu and convinces him to take sides against the Tokugawa.
August 17 – Ishida Mitsunari, Ankokuji Ekei, Ōtani Yoshitsugu and Mashita Nagamori meet in Sawayama and agree to ask Mōri Terumoto to become commander in chief of the alliance. Nagamori secretly sends Ieyasu news about the meeting.
August 22 – Mōri Terumoto arrives at Osaka Castle and takes command of the Western Alliance.
August 23 - Battle of Gifu Castle begins, Oda Hidenobu of the  western forces against Ikeda Terumasa, Ikeda Sen and Fukushima Masanori of the eastern forces. 
August 27 – Siege of Fushimi, led by Mitsunari and Kobayakawa Hideaki.
August 29 – Ieyasu establishes his headquarters in Oyama, Shizuoka to discuss strategy with allies.
August 30 – Battle of Asai, Maeda Toshinaga for the Eastern coalition, stems a force of Niwa Nagashige supported by Uesugi Kagekatsu.
September 1 – Siege of Shiroishi, Uesugi Kagekatsu loses Shiroishi Castle to Date Masamune's pro-Tokugawa troops .
September 6 – fall of Fushimi castle, Torii Mototada dies.
September 7 – Maeda Toshinaga (Tokugawa ally) attacks his brother, Toshimasa, and besieges Daishoji Castle. The commander of the garrison, Yamaguchi Munenaga, commits seppuku.
September 10 – Ieyasu returns to Edo Castle from Oyama.
September 15 – Mitsunari's Western army arrives at Ogaki Castle.
September 29 – Nabeshima Naoshige and other Western Army generals besiege Matsuoka Castle. The Army of the East occupies the heights of Akasaka, near Ogaki Castle. 
September 29 – Fall of Gifu Castle into the hands of the Eastern coalition. Tokugawa Hidetada heads towards Nakasendo.
September 30 – Mōri Hidemoto lays siege to Annotsu Castle held by Tomita Nobutaka.
October 1 – Mitsunari returns to Sawayama Castle from Ogaki, asking Terumoto to move.
October 7 – Ieyasu leaves Edo at the head of 30,000 men towards Tokaido.
October 9 – Hidetada reaches Komoro, Nagano and against the orders of his father, diverts his forces towards Ueda.
October 12 – Ieyasu passes through Shimada in Suruga. Hidetada camps in Sometani village to besieged Ueda Castle against Sanada Masayuki.
October 13 – Ieyasu passes through Nakaizumi in Tōtōmi. Mōri Hidemoto and Kikkawa Hiroie enters Mino and sets up camp near Mount Nangu. Mōri Hidekane, Tachibana Muneshige and Tsukushi Hirokado besiege Ōtsu Castle, held for Ieyasu by Kyōgoku Takatsugu.
October 14 - Ieyasu receives a secret messenger from Kobayakawa Hideaki, who offers him support. Naoe Kanetsugu leads the Uesugi forces against Mogami Yoshiaki at the Siege of Hasedo.
October 16 – Hidetada abandons the Siege of Ueda Castle and heads to Mino.
October 19 – Ieyasu arrives at Gifu castle in Mino. Kuroda Yoshitaka defeats Ōtomo Yoshimune and other Mitsunari allied generals at the Battle of Ishigakibara.
October 20 – Ieyasu moves to Akasaka. The two coalitions make contact at Kuisegawa, near Akasaka. The Eastern force retreats to Sekigahara. The Western coalition heads to Sekigahara from Ogaki Castle.
October 21 – Battle of Sekigahara
October 30 – Date Masamune tries to conquer Fukushima Castle but retires. (In May 1601, during the Battle of Matsukawa, Masamune is repelled by Honjō Shigenaga.)
November 5 - Naoe Kanetsugu called a full withdrawal of all Uesugi forces, putting an end to Uesugi's campaigns in the north.

Notable figures

Before the fateful confrontation in Sekigahara, Ishida Mitsunari claimed Osaka Castle and planned to take hostages from relatives loyal to Toyotomi. He hoped to use them to force his rival generals to join his cause. He sought to make noblewomen Hosokawa Gracia, Yamauchi Chiyo and Kushihashi Teru as political hostages, and other women were targets of Mitsunari's plan.

When Mitsunari's soldiers threatened to take Hosokawa's home, Hosokawa Gracia was killed to protect her honor by a family soldier named Ogasawara Shōsai. He and the rest of the residents committed seppuku to avoid capture. As the last notable survivor of the Akechi clan, the clan responsible for the death of Oda Nobunaga, Gracia's death impacted both armies. The incident did much damage to Ishida's reputation, which greatly reduced his chances of recruiting more allies, some of whom were also secretly Christians.

After Hideyoshi's death, Kodain-in (Hideyoshi's chief consort) left Osaka Castle and lived as a castellan in Kyoto. Hideyoshi's second wife, Yodo-dono, inherited the political power of both figures, as Hideyori was too young to lead the Toyotomi clan. Yodo-dono was present in the maintenance of the Western army, although she did not play a very notable role during the campaign. Subsequently, Ieyasu began to receive hostages, nobles who were involved with the Mitsunari army, such as Maeda Matsu, whose son, Maeda Toshimasa, was involved in the Western army, while her other son, Maeda Toshinaga, was an ally of the Eastern army. After Ieyasu defeated Mitsunari in Sekigahara, Kodain-in received several women from the Western army at her home.

Kuki Yoshitaka, one of Nobunaga and Hideyoshi's top generals, fought alongside the western forces, while his son Kuki Moritaka joined the eastern forces, under Tokugawa Ieyasu. Following Tokugawa's victory, his son successfully guaranteed Yoshitaka's safety from Ieyasu. In a turn of fate, Yoshitaka committed seppuku before the news from Moritaka reached him.

Legend has it that the rōnin Miyamoto Musashi was present at the battle among Ukita Hideie's army and escaped the defeat of Hideie's forces unharmed. Musashi would have been around 16 years of age at the time. There is no hard evidence to prove whether Musashi was present or not for the battle. According to one account, the Musashi yuko gamei, "Musashi's achievements stood out from the crowd, and were known by the soldiers in all camps." Musashi is reticent on the matter, writing only that he had "participated in over six battles since my youth".

The cannons from the Liefde, the trading ship that English sailor William Adams came to Japan on, were used by Tokugawa's forces at Sekigahara. It is unlikely Adams himself was at the battle, although some fictional accounts have entertained the possibility.

Battlefield

The site of the battle was designated a National Historic Site of Japan in 1931. The site encompasses the sites of the initial position of Tokugawa Ieyasu (徳川家康最初陣地), the final position of Tokugawa Ieyasu (徳川家康最後陣地), the position of Ishida Mitsunari (石田三成陣地), the Okayama beacon (岡山烽火場), the grave of Ōtani Yoshitsugu (大谷吉隆墓), the east kubizuka (東首塚), and the west kubizuka (西首塚)

Cultural depictions
The Battle of Sekigahara has been depicted in a number of works of literature. Ryōtarō Shiba wrote a three-volume historical novel called Sekigahara on it in the 1960s. James Clavell's 1975 novel, Shōgun, includes a fictionalized version of both the political struggle and the battle. Tokyo Broadcasting System aired a television miniseries about the subject in January 1981, also entitled , loosely based on Shiba's novel series. It featured actors Hisaya Morishige, Gō Katō and Rentarō Mikuni.

The battle did not get a full movie featuring it until 2017, with previous inclusions generally only including a brief snippet in passing, such as the beginning of the 1954 movie Samurai I or the 1991 film Journey of Honor. This changed with the 2017 film Sekigahara, which covers the rivalry between Ishida Mitsunari and Tokugawa Ieyasu before leading to the battle itself in the final third of the film. The film is somewhat notable in being a revisionist reassessment, showing Tokugawa more as an antagonist while Mitsunari is a man of honor and the main protagonist. The 2008 BBC docudrama television series Heroes and Villains includes an episode which depicts the battle. The anime Sengoku Basara: Samurai Kings depicts the different alliances and armies from a more fantastic (and less realistic) viewpoint, with a less bloody conclusion.

The 2000 video game Kessen is set during the conflict between Tokugawa and Toyotomi clan, and features the Battle of Sekigahara. It also provides an alternate scenario in case the Western forces win the battle. GMT Games produced the 2011 block wargame Sekigahara: Unification of Japan, which attempts to reflect the patchy loyalties of the armies involved by having randomized cards represent the loyalty of specific armies; players know which of their units are "reliable" but their opponents are not necessarily sure. The 2017 video game Nioh includes a mission related to the battle and features heavily fictionalized versions of the events leading up to it.

Notes

References

Bibliography

Further reading 
Paul Davis used the following sources to compile the chapter "Sekigahara, 21 October 1600" in 100 Decisive Battles: From Ancient Times to the Present "Sekigahara, 21 October 1600."
 De Lange, William. Samurai Battles: The Long Road to Unification Groningen: Toyo Press, 2020
 Sadler, A.L. The Maker of Modern Japan: The Life of Tokugawa Ieyasu London: George Allen & Unwin, 1937
 Sansom, George. A History of Japan from 1334–1615 Stanford University Press, 1961
 Turnbull, Stephen. The Samurai: A Military History New York: Macmillan, 1977

External links 
 SengokuDaimyo.com The website of samurai author and historian Anthony J. Bryant. Bryant is the author of the above-mentioned Sekigahara 1600: The Final Struggle for Power.
 Several strategy war games based on the battle: Sekigahara: Unification of Japan

1600 in Asia
1600 in Japan
Sekigahara 1600
Sekigahara
Sekigahara, Gifu
Historic Sites of Japan